Sydney on Vaal is a ghost-town in Frances Baard District Municipality in the Northern Cape province of South Africa.
The village lies 30 km northwest of Barkly West and several kilometres south of Delportshoop. It was founded in 1902 and is variously said to be named after Sidney Mendelssohn, Director of the Vaal River Diamond and Exploration Company which owned the land, as well as after its situation on the Vaal River, and after Sidney Shippard, Acting Attorney of the Executive Council of Griqualand West in 1872.

References

Populated places in the Dikgatlong Local Municipality